La Vie est belle  / Life is Rosy is a 1987 musical comedy directed by Mwezé Ngangura and Benoît Lamy. The film revolves around the vibrant music scene of Kinshasa and tells the rags-to-riches story of a poor rural musician played by legendary Congolese musician, Papa Wemba, the “King of Rumba Rock”, who seeks fame in the big city.  The film was considered a major turning point in film production in the DRC with its more artistic approach. Unlike many African films of the time that concerned themselves with the effects of colonialism, La vie est belle celebrates Congolese culture, music and the lives of Kinshasans. The film score features Congolese music from artists Tshala Muana, Klody, and Zaiko Langa Langa, a Congolese soukous band co-founded by Papa Wemba. 

Ngangura's inspiration for making La vie est Belle took root while attending the Panafrican Film and Television Festival of Ouagadougou where his short Kin-Kiesse (1983) won the best documentary award.  In watching many of the African films screened at the festival "it was clear to me that those films were not directed to an African audience. Africa in most of these films was only a subject and the audience was outside the filmmakers’ calculations.”

The making of La vie est belle was also informed by comedy sketches, which used to be featured regularly on national television, and were popular with African audiences with how they addressed their everyday lives. Ngangura's decision to center the film on music and Papa Wembe was calculated to draw in Congolese audiences as well as reach as many Africans as possible given the widespread popularity of music, especially of the Congo, which then had the most popular musicians on the continent.

Synopsis 
Kourou (played by Papa Wemba) goes from his village to Kinshasa, his heart full of dreams of music and success. The capital city of Zaire is then the center of "World Music". Once there, he falls in love with Kabibi, a virginal young woman who wants to be a secretary. Unfortunately Nvouandou, a club owner searching for a second wife, also wants to marry her. Will Nvouandou's first wife turn out to be the best ally for young Kourou?

Cast

Awards 
 The Georges Delerue Prize of the Ghent International Film Festival (1987)
 Bronze Mask of Taormina International Film Festival.

References

External links 

 

1987 films
Georges Delerue Award winners
Democratic Republic of the Congo drama films
Films set in the Democratic Republic of the Congo
Films shot in the Democratic Republic of the Congo
Creative Commons-licensed films
Films directed by Benoît Lamy
Films directed by Mwezé Ngangura